Kokey at Ako (stylized as Kokey @ Ako) is a 2010 Philippine comedy-fantasy drama series that serves as a sequel to the 2007 TV series Kokey. Directed by Wenn V. Deramas, the series stars Toni Gonzaga and Vhong Navarro with Melai Cantiveros, with an ensemble cast consisting of Ms. Gloria Romero, Jason Francisco, Mickey Ferriols, Maricel Laxa, Christian Vasquez, Wendy Valdez, Mike Lloren, Joy Viado, Tess Antonio, Francis Magundayao, Yulio Pisk, Empoy Marquez, Debralis Velasote, DJ Durano, Candy Pangilinan, Bugoy Cariño, Philip Nolasco, and Macky Billiones in their supporting roles. The series premiered on ABS-CBN's Primetime Bida nighttime block, replacing Momay and was replaced by Sabel from September 20 to December 3, 2010.

This series can be seen on Jeepney TV YouTube Channel.

Plot summary
The series follows the alien Kokey and the human reporter Jackie as they work to reunite with their families while the aliens from Planet Kukurikabu plot to exterminate mankind.

Cast and characters

Cast

Main cast
 Toni Gonzaga as Jackie
 Vhong Navarro as Bruce

Supporting cast
Gloria Romero as Barbara Reyes
Melai Cantiveros as Josa Reyes
Mickey Ferriols as Annie Reyes
Maricel Laxa-Pangilinan as Dianne Reyes
Christian Vasquez as Roland Reyes
Wendy Valdez as Lois Magsanoc
Mike Lloren as King Cone
Joy Viado† as Bebot
Tess Antonio as Babet
Francis Magundayao/Yulio Pisk as Belat
Empoy Marquez as Bubot
Debralis Velasote as Vangie
DJ Durano as Dr. DJ Caparas
Candy Pangilinan as Cynthia Caparas
Bugoy Cariño as Caloy
Macky Billiones as Niño

Extended cast
Rubi-Rubi Esmaquel as Fifi
Jojit Lorenzo as Dick
Atak Arana as Atak
Eric Nicolas as Tom
Simon Ibarra as Jerry
Minco Fabregas as Tinnio Tan
Mark Valdez as Antony Precie
Andre Garcia as Baldo
Marissa Orillo

Special participation
Dennis Padilla as Eduardo "Chong Edong" Reyes
Nova Villa as Sor Aida Sanchez
Abby Bautista as young Princess Reyes / Jackie Reyes
Amy Nobleza as young Josa Reyes
Frenchie Dy/Kiray Celis (young) as Bam-Bam
Frances Ignacio as Toribia
Johan Santos as Mike
Tanya Gomez as Linda Magsanoc
Jairus Aquino as Rolly / Young Roland
Cheska Billiones as Nena / Young Dianne
Jewel Crisanto as Ada (Caloy's playmate in the adoption center)
Marissa Orillo as herself
Emerson Lee as boarding mate

Characters

Earthlings
Toni Gonzaga/Abby Bautista (young) as Princess Reyes / Jackie Reyes - Jackie is a survivor from a massacre plot against her family, an alien abduction, growing up without parents to provide her needs, and moving on with life with no memory of her real identity. Despite her traumatic past, Jackie is a positive thinker. She is a resourceful and determined news reporter with a special interest in paranormal and extraterrestrial activities. She is obsessed with retracing the events of the past—looking for any leads of alien movements, hoping to find possible indications of her parents’ whereabouts. And that vital lead may be Kokey. The role was originally given to Angel Locsin. Locsin was replaced by Gonzaga due to Locsin's commitment to Imortal.
Vhong Navarro/ Kyle Balili (young)
as Bruce Kho Reyes - Bruce used to be the boy who fell in love with the little rich girl with no memory. He is Jackie's best friend, confidante and companion in the search for her missing parents. The hard work and sacrifices he made paid off when his one great love accepted his proposal to be his wife. One day before the wedding, Bruce accepts a news coverage that leads to an unfortunate accident of stellar proportions. Bruce seems to get mad at Bam-Bam (Toribia's Daughter) and helping Jackie and Josa as Bam-Bam teases them.
as Belat - See: Belat
Melai Cantiveros/ Amy Nobleza (young) as Josa Reyes - Josa sees and does everything in a different way---odd but funny. She is Bruce's cousin, and Jackie's best friend and pseudo-sister. Her carefree attitude is refreshing, but would often lead to a lot of hilarious misadventures.
Jason Francisco as Adonis - Adonis had been training as a cameraman for Channel Z for the last six years but can't get a promotion. When Bruce starts working for the station, Adonis becomes one of his good friends. Adonis eventually becomes Josa's love interest.
Ms. Gloria Romero as Barbara Reyes - Madam Barbra is a sophisticated woman who owns a TV network, Z Broadcasting Company, as well as several companies. Her authority cannot be questioned, but behind her straightforward, stern and unyielding command is a grandmother longing to be reunited with her long-lost son and granddaughter.
Mickey Ferriols as Annie Reyes - Annie is Barbara's adopted daughter. She is insecure so she had done bad plans. She is the one who planned to kill Jackie (Princess)'s family. When the years passed, she wants to get the company (Z Broadcasting Company), and she knew that Jackie is Princess. So, she used Lois, to pretend to be Princess Reyes, the long-lost granddaughter of Barbara, but all of her plans didn't work. In the last episode, She vanished after she used her powers.
Wendy Valdez as Lois Magsanoc - Jackie's rival to the heart of Bruce and she pretended to be Princess Reyes (which Annie planned) because of her ambition to be an actress. When the truth was known that she is not the real Princess because Barbara saw her mother, a crazy one. And instead of being mad, she helped Barbara's family, even Jackie.

Yekokans
Kokey - Kokey returns to Planet Earth to find his missing sister before she unwittingly wreaks havoc on mankind. In his search for his furry sibling, Kokey gets to meet new friends and goes into another roller-coaster adventure ride of his life.
Kekay - Kekay is Kokey's jealous furry little sister. She was born thinking she was disliked and unloved by her parents, and grew up envious over her brother's popularity not only in Planet Yekok but on Earth as well. Her sense of curiosity and misadventure sends her to an accidental journey to Earth.
Umamay Kakay - Kokey and Kekay's mother.
Tay Kokoy - Kokey and Kekay's father.

Kukurikabukans
Mike Lloren as King Cone - King Cone is the ruthless ruler of planet Kukurikabu. Disobedience of his orders will mean death to any human or exile to outer space for Kukurikabukans.
Joy Viado as Bebot - One of the three elders of the more than 350 children spawned by King Cone. They are ruthless and heartless as their father; very much enthusiastic in brewing plans to invade other planets, particularly Earth, to call their second home.
Tess Antonio as Babet - One of the three elders of the more than 350 children spawned by King Cone. They are ruthless and heartless as their father; very much enthusiastic in brewing plans to invade other planets, particularly Earth, to call their second home.
Francis Magundayao as Belat - Prince Belat is one of the thousands of King Cone's kids. He is affectionate and caring towards the human prisoners of his father, an unthinkable and forbidden behavior for children of royalty. The young prince is most especially attached to Dianne, whom he treated as his mother. Belat's attachment to Dianne drove him to invent a spaceship to send the human couple back to their home planet. As Belat attempts to fly his alien craft to Earth, an accident occurs leaving him trapped in Bruce's body.
Empoy Marquez as Bubot - One of the three elders of the more than 350 children spawned by King Cone. They are ruthless and heartless as their father; very much enthusiastic in brewing plans to invade other planets, particularly Earth, to call their second home.

Production

Reception

Launch
Kokey at Ako was postponed three times before it was given an official premiere date. It was originally announced as one of the ABS-CBN's offering for the 60th Celebration of Filipino Soap Opera (Ika-60 taon ng Pinoy Soap Opera), during the ABS-CBN Trade Launch for the first quarter of 2010, entitled Bagong Simula (New Beginning).

However, it was postponed and was launched again as one of the ABS-CBN's offerings for the second quarter of 2010, during the ABS-CBN Trade Launch and was announced during the Kapamilya Trade Launch held in Boracay.

The show was later announced as half-term show line-up by ABS-CBN as part of the 60th Anniversary of Philippines Television and was presented as the station's ID for the rainy season in the Philippines. The trailer premiered on June 26, 2010 on its official website.

See also
List of Kokey (TV series) episodes
List of programs broadcast by ABS-CBN

References

2010 Philippine television series debuts
2010 Philippine television series endings
ABS-CBN drama series
Fantaserye and telefantasya
Filipino-language television shows
2010s children's television series
Philippine comedy television series
Television series by Star Creatives
Television shows set in the Philippines
Live action television shows based on films
Sequel television series